Myle may refer to:
a Middle English alternative form of Mile
Myle (Lycia), a town of ancient Lycia
 Myle (Cilicia), a town of ancient Cilicia